The Living Weapons is volume fourteen in the French comic book (or bande dessinée) science fiction series Valérian and Laureline created by writer Pierre Christin and artist Jean-Claude Mézières.

Principal characters
 Valérian, a spatio-temporal agent from Galaxity, future capital of Earth, in the 28th century.
 Laureline, originally from France in the 11th century, now a spatio-temporal agent of Galaxity in the 28th century.
 Albert, Valérian and Laureline's contact on 20th century Earth .
 Brittibrit, a transformist artist from the planet Chab.
 Doum A Goum, a virtually indestructible, rock-eating creature.
 Yfysania, a creature capable of teleportation.
 Schniarfeur, a living weapon from the planet Bromn. The Schniarfeur's weapons are its irritating voice and its destructive spit. The planet Bromn is so dangerous that all its inhabitants, including the Schniarfeur, are in a state of perpetual aggression. A Schniarfeur's aggression can be tempered by operating on its chabounal gland.
 Rompf, a Lord of War from Blopik.
 Wauk, a Lord of War from Blopik and Rompf's rival.

Settings
 Blopik, the third planet in the Constellation of Orpheus. Blopikians are a mixture of minotaur and centaur having the head of a bull and the body of a horse. Despite their fearsome appearance, they are ruminants. Their planet is mostly rocky, primarily red and brown in colour with many canyons and ravines. Primitive wooded bridges connect the ravines. The Blopikian natives regularly make war on their great plains. When the forests of the high ranges reach maturity and bear fruit, the Blopikians set them on fire to start the war between the rival tribes.
 Earth, Russia, the late 1980s after the events of On the Frontiers but before the collapse of the Soviet Union. Valérian and Laureline take Brittibrit, Doum-a-Goum and Yfysania to join the Moscow State Circus.

Notes
 This album marks the first appearance in the Valérian series of a Schniarfeur living weapon. Another will appear in Hostages of the Ultralum and At the Edge of the Great Void.
 In the opening pages, Valérian and Laureline go through a strange phenomenon on board their ship which sees them transform: he with a stretching body, she becoming transparent. This is very similar to Mister Fantastic and the Invisible Woman of the Fantastic Four, though in Valérian and Laureline's case the effect is temporary.
 This album was translated into English by Timothy Ryan Smith and published, along with On the Frontiers and The Circles of Power in the same volume, in November 2004 by iBooks under the title Valerian: The New Future Trilogy. The pages were shrunk from their normal size to US comic book size.

1990 graphic novels
Valérian and Laureline